Incubator is death metal group from Germany. Active during the 1990s, they notably released two albums on the bigger metal indie labels Steamhammer/SPV and Massacre Records.

Their albums were reviewed by the metal press including Rockhard.de, Metal.de and Powermetal.de.

Discography
 Symphonies of Spiritual Cannibalism (1991, Morbid Music)
 McGillroy the Housefly (1992, West Virginia Records)
 Hirnnektar (1993, Steamhammer/SPV)
 MCMETALXCVIII (1998, Chameleon Records) 
 Divine Comedy (2000, Godz Greed Records)
 LieBISSlieder (2008, Massacre Records)

References

External links 
 

German death metal musical groups
Musical groups established in 1989
Musical groups disestablished in 2000
Steamhammer Records artists
Massacre Records artists